Stratulat is a Moldovan or Romanian surname. Notable people with the surname include:

Gheorghe Stratulat (born 1976), Moldovan footballer
Natalia Stratulat (born 1987), Moldovan discus thrower

Surnames of Moldovan origin
Romanian-language surnames